Barvanan-e Sharqi Rural District is in Torkamanchay District of Mianeh County, East Azerbaijan province, Iran. At the National Census of 2006, its population was 8,304 in 2,003 households. There were 7,400 inhabitants in 2,134 households at the following census of 2011. At the most recent census of 2016, the population of the rural district was 6,356 in 2,148 households. The largest of its 16 villages was Sowmaeh-ye Olya, with 2,432 people.

References 

Meyaneh County

Rural Districts of East Azerbaijan Province

Populated places in East Azerbaijan Province

Populated places in Meyaneh County